Harriston is an unincorporated community in Cooper County, in the U.S. state of Missouri. The community was located along the Missouri–Kansas–Texas Railroad line approximately three miles southwest of Pilot Grove.

History
Harriston was laid out in 1873 by Dr. N. W. Harris, and named for him.  A post office called Harriston was established in 1873, and remained in operation until 1908.

References

Unincorporated communities in Cooper County, Missouri
Unincorporated communities in Missouri